Hutson Taylor Mason (born September 20, 1991) is a former American football quarterback. He played college football at Georgia and was the Bulldogs starting quarterback in 2014. He was signed as an undrafted free agent by the Washington Redskins in 2015.

Mason currently works as a broadcaster for ESPN and a sports radio host for WCNN in Atlanta, Georgia. He is also a contributor to The Federalist, writing about sports and politics.

Early years
Mason attended Lassiter High School in Marietta, Georgia. As a senior, he threw for a Georgia high school record 4,560 yards and 54 touchdowns and was the state's Gatorade Football Player of the Year. In his two years as starter he threw for 8,265 yards and 85 touchdowns.

College career
As a true freshman at the University of Georgia in 2010, Mason played in four games as a backup quarterback to Aaron Murray. He passed for 102 yards and had one touchdown. As a sophomore in 2011, he again was the backup to Murray, passing for 254 yards and two touchdowns. In 2012, he redshirted so that he could have another year of eligibility. Mason returned in 2013 as the backup to Murray. After Murray tore his ACL, Mason took over as Georgia's starting quarterback and made his first career start against Georgia Tech. He finished the game 22 of 36 for 299 yards and two touchdowns. Mason also started the 2014 Gator Bowl, passing for 320 yards with one touchdown. Overall, he appeared in five games, going 67 of 110 for 968 yards, five touchdowns and three interceptions. In 2014, he took over as Georgia's starting quarterback after Murray graduated. He started all 13 games, completing 188 of 277 for 2,167 yards, 21 touchdowns, and four interceptions.

Professional career

Washington Redskins
Mason signed with the Washington Redskins on May 18, 2015. He was released on June 9, 2015.

Saskatchewan Roughriders
Mason was signed by the Saskatchewan Roughriders on September 9, 2015. He was released by the Roughriders on October 20, 2015.

Mason participated in The Spring League in 2017.

Post-playing career

Since 2017, Mason has provided color commentary for college football games on ESPN networks.

In 2018, Mason began a career in sports radio, co-hosting Tug and Hut with Tug Cowart on WFOM in Atlanta. In September 2020, Mason began co-hosting Buck and Hut on WFOM's parent station WCNN, pairing him with fellow former Georgia Bulldogs quarterback Buck Belue. Mason replaced longtime WCNN host John Kincade, who was laid off due to budget cuts in the wake of the COVID-19 pandemic. Mason also hosts a weekly college football preview show called Game Day With Hutson Mason on the SportsMap Radio Network, which airs nationally on Saturday mornings during college football season. 

In July 2021, he became one of five hosts of The Locker Room on WCNN alongside Brian Finneran, Joe Hamilton, John Michaels and Brandon Leak.

In 2020, Mason began working as a contributor to the conservative political commentary blog The Federalist.

In August 2022, Mason won the Long Drive Competition at the John Smoltz Golf Classic.

References

External links
Georgia Bulldogs bio

1991 births
Living people
Sportspeople from Marietta, Georgia
Players of American football from Marietta, Georgia
American football quarterbacks
Canadian football quarterbacks
American players of Canadian football
Georgia Bulldogs football players
Washington Redskins players
Saskatchewan Roughriders players
The Spring League players
College football announcers